Aika may refer to:

Arts and media
 Aika (album), a 1996 album by Finnish singer-songwriter Aki Sirkesalo
Agent Aika, a 1997 anime OVA produced by Bandai Visual and Studio Fantasia
AIKA Online, an MMORPG
Aikakone or Aika, a Finnish musical group
Aika, a character from the video game Skies of Arcadia
Aika, a 1984 Indian short film directed by Gulzar (lyricist)
 "Aika", a song from the album Unified by Super8 & Tab

People
Aika (singer), Japanese singer/songwriter
, Japanese gravure idol and professional wrestler
Aika Hakoyama (born 1991), Japanese synchronized swimmer
Aika Kobayashi (born 1993), Japanese singer and voice actress
, is a former member of the Japanese idol group HKT48
, is a Japanese singer
, is a Japanese YouTuber and singer
, is a Japanese singer and songwriter

Other uses
Aika, an ancient name of Troia (FG), Italy

Japanese feminine given names